Caroline Bamberger Frank Fuld (nickname, "Carrie"; March 16, 1864 – July 18, 1944) was an American businesswoman and philanthropist. She and her brother Louis Bamberger co-founded the Institute for Advanced Study in Princeton, New Jersey.

Biography
Caroline ("Carrie") Bamberger grew up in Baltimore, the fifth of six children born to Elkan Bamberger, who had emigrated from Bavaria in 1840, and Theresa (Hutzler) Bamberger, who was heir to a large Baltimore department store. Her siblings were Clara "Lavinia" Bamberger; Rosa Bamberger; Louis Bamberger; Julius Bamberger; Pauline Bamberger; and Julia Bamberger. Fuld moved with her brother Louis to Philadelphia in 1883, and the two of them, with business partners Louis Meyer Frank and Felix Fuld, started the business that became L. Bamberger and Co.  The four partners all worked in the store and developed new methods of retail advertising and selling.

Fuld married Louis Frank in 1883, a marriage that lasted until the latter's death in 1910.  In 1913, she married her other business partner, Felix Fuld, outliving also his death in 1929.  Neither marriage produced children.  Bamberger and Fuld sold L. Bamberger and Co. to R. H. Macy and Co. in June 1929 (for an amount estimated between $25 – 50 million dollars, paid entirely in cash), before the stock market crash. After the sale, they shared $1 million of the proceeds with 235 long-time employees.

Subsequently, Fuld devoted her energies to philanthropy.  With her husband, and continuing after his death, she contributed to Jewish charities, including Newark's Beth Israel Hospital, the Jewish Relief Committee, and Hadassah.  In 1931, she was elected national director of the National Council of Jewish Women.

Most remembered, however, is the decision in 1929 by Fuld and her brother to seek the advice of Abraham Flexner, and subsequently to support, and endow financially, his vision for what became the Institute for Advanced Study in Princeton.  Fuld and Bamberger contributed $5 million in 1930 for its initial endowment, and approximately $18 million over time.  Fuld was vice-president of the nascent Institute until 1933, and thereafter was a life trustee.

References

External links
 Joan N. Burstyn, Past and Promise: Lives of New Jersey Women, The Women's project of New Jersey (1997), pp. 142–143.
 "Mrs. Fuld, Noted for Gifts, Is Dead", The New York Times, July 19, 1944.

1864 births
1944 deaths
Institute for Advanced Study people
American people of German-Jewish descent
American women in business
Jewish American philanthropists
National Council of Jewish Women
Hutzler family